Charles Hubert Dixon (16 June 1903 – 1 March 1983) was an English professional footballer who played as a centre-half. He played a total of 60 matches in the Football League for Bournemouth & Boscombe Athletic, Nelson and Southport.

References

1903 births
1983 deaths
People from Warwickshire
English footballers
Association football defenders
Sunderland A.F.C. players
AFC Bournemouth players
Southport F.C. players
Nelson F.C. players
Hednesford Town F.C. players
English Football League players
Cannock Town F.C. players
Connah's Quay & Shotton F.C. players